Dr. Giggles is a 1992 American slasher film directed by Manny Coto, starring Larry Drake as Evan Rendell Jr., the eponymous Dr. Giggles, and Holly Marie Combs as Jennifer Campbell. The film co-stars Cliff DeYoung and Glenn Quinn. It was released on October 23, 1992.

Plot
In the town of Moorehigh in 1957, the patients of Dr. Evan Rendell kept disappearing. The townspeople found out the father and son duo had been ripping out the patients' hearts — in an attempt to bring back the doctor's dead wife. The townspeople stoned Dr. Rendell to death, but his son Evan Jr. disappeared.

Thirty-five years later, the adult Evan Jr. (now nicknamed "Dr. Giggles" for his hideous laugh and insatiable obsession to follow in his father's footsteps) escapes from a mental asylum, killing everyone in his path. In Moorehigh, 19-year-old Jennifer Campbell, her boyfriend Max Anderson, and their friends are planning their summer break. Jennifer, already upset by family trouble, is further distressed from having a heart condition and being forced to wear a heart monitor. Dr. Giggles returns to his childhood home, goes through Evan Sr.'s files, and gathers a list of names. He begins stalking and killing several residents, including Jennifer's friends.

After the party, Jennifer becomes fed up with her heart monitor and dumps it in a fish tank. Jennifer's father finds it and leaves to look for her. Dr. Giggles shows up and kills his girlfriend (Jennifer's prospective stepmother). Jennifer returns to the party and sees Max kissing another girl. Distraught, she runs into the house of mirrors. Dr. Giggles notices Jennifer has the same heart condition as his mother and goes after her. He kills the girl Max was kissing, but Jennifer sees him coming and escapes. Officers Magruder and Reitz find her and take her to the police station.

Officer Magruder explains to Reitz how Evan Jr. escaped. He was on guard duty at the morgue housing the bodies of Dr. Rendell and his wife. Investigating a giggle, he witnessed Evan Jr. cutting his way out of his mother's body with a scalpel. He realized that Rendell had cut open his wife's body, stuffed his son in and sewn it shut. Upon being threatened by Evan Jr., Magruder passed out from shock. When he woke up, Rendell's wife's corpse had been re-sewn, and all traces of the event at the morgue had been wiped clean.

Dr. Giggles makes his way to Jennifer's house and attacks her father. Officer Magruder goes to investigate Jennifer's house and finds her father there, lying in a pool of blood. Dr. Giggles mortally wounds Magruder who, recognizing Evan Jr., shoots and wounds him before dying. Reitz arrives soon after, finding his partner dead and Jennifer's father wounded but alive.

Meanwhile, Dr. Giggles returns to his hideout, performing surgery on himself to remove the bullet. He kidnaps Jennifer and tells her his plan to replace her "broken" heart with one he took from her friends. Reitz and Max arrive. While Reitz distracts Dr. Giggles, Max and Jennifer escape. Dr. Giggles kills Reitz, but his father's house explodes and collapses on him.

At the hospital, Jennifer learns that the events of the evening have damaged her heart, requiring immediate surgery. While she is being prepped, Dr. Giggles reappears and cuts a bloody path through the hospital staff. He chases her to a janitor's closet. Jennifer ambushes and finally kills Dr. Giggles with his own instruments. Dr. Giggles breaks the fourth wall, staring at the camera and weakly asking, "Is...there a...doctor in the house?" before he collapses and dies.

Recovering in the hospital, Jennifer is visited by Max and her father.

Cast

Production
On 11 August 1992, the Daily Variety reported that Largo Entertainment signed an exclusive first-look deal with Dark Horse Comics to develop and produce films based on Dark Horse's franchises. Dr. Giggles was the first film produced as part of this venture.

Bad Company singer Paul Rodgers covered the song Bad Case of Lovin' You for the soundtrack.

Release

Dr Giggles was the first film distributed by Universal Pictures through its distribution deal with Largo. Universal would handle domestic distribution and release the film in all territories except for Japan and Italy, where the film would be released by the Victor Co. of Japan Ltd. and Penta Films respectively. The film premiered in Los Angeles and New York on 23 October 1992.

The original release was on October 23, 1992 and the re-release on December 12, 2009 at New Beverly Cinema in Los Angeles. Following writing and directing Dr.Giggles, Coto created some more original stories about the character for a then upcoming comic-book series from Dark Horse.

Critical response
On review aggregator Rotten Tomatoes, Dr. Giggles holds an approval rating of 20% based on 30 reviews and an average rating of 3.6/10. Its consensus reads, "Larry Drake's deranged performance as the titular doctor is just about all that distinguishes Dr. Giggles from its slasher brethren." Audiences polled by CinemaScore gave the film an average grade of "C+" on an A+ to F scale.

Variety called it a "wildly uneven horror film" and said that the film focuses too much on cheap laughs. Vincent Canby also criticized the script in his review for The New York Times, stating, "The screenplay is stitched together from variations on cliches used by or about the medical community." The Washington Post wrote, "Manny Coto turns to co-writer Graeme Whifler time and again for punchlines in a desperate attempt to revive a script that begins in critical condition and ends up DOA." Sight & Sound wrote that the film's satire "gives way to a few nicely nasty moments" but that the film never tops the visual flair of the opening credits.

References

External links
 
 
 
 
 
 
 Good Bad Flicks review

1992 films
1992 horror films
1990s American films
1990s English-language films
1990s comedy horror films
1990s slasher films
American comedy horror films
American films about revenge
American serial killer films
American slasher films
Films about organ transplantation
Films about surgeons
Films directed by Manny Coto
Films scored by Brian May (composer)
Films set in 1957
Films set in 1992
Films set in California
Films shot in Oregon
Films shot in Portland, Oregon
Dark Horse Entertainment films
Largo Entertainment films